Debra Ann Campbell Teare (July 11, 1955 – November 10, 2018) was an American artist, a founding member of The International Guild of Realism, and "One of the most successful trompe-l'œil painters today. Before switching to oils, Teare spent the first portion of her career "large photorealistic drawings in black and white" charcoals.

Teare was born to Don Spencer Campbell and Julia Picket Campbell and grew up in the Cache Valley of Utah and studied Illustration at Utah State University (though dropped out of the course). She began her career in New York City and lived the final years of her life in Providence, Utah.

Her work usually consisted of precise photo-realist paintings of still life objects.

She married artist Brad Teare in 1983. She had one daughter, Ashley.

References

External links
Artist bio at the International Guild of Realism
Artist bio at the Atlanta Art Gallery

Utah State University alumni
American Latter Day Saints
Painters from Utah
Trompe-l'œil artists
People from Cache County, Utah
1955 births
2018 deaths
American women painters
20th-century American women artists
21st-century American women artists
20th-century American painters
21st-century American painters